State Route 145 (SR 145, OH 145) is a  long north–south state highway in the southeastern quadrant of the U.S. state of Ohio. The western terminus of SR 145 is at a T-intersection with SR 821 in Lower Salem.

Route description
Along its path, SR 145 passes through northern Washington County, the southeastern Noble County, northwestern Monroe County and southern Belmont County.  No part of SR 145 is included as a part of the National Highway System.

History
The SR 145 designation was applied in 1923.  It was originally routed from its southern terminus in Lower Salem to its junction with SR 78 in Lewisville.  SR 145 was extended to the north in 1937, routed from SR 78 in Lewisville to then-SR 8 in Malaga.

Major intersections

References

145
Transportation in Washington County, Ohio
Transportation in Noble County, Ohio
Transportation in Monroe County, Ohio
Transportation in Belmont County, Ohio